Capitol Theater (Düsseldorf)  is the largest theatre in Düsseldorf, North Rhine-Westphalia, Germany.

Background
The building, which is over 100 years old, is a former Straßenbahn depot of the Rheinbahn, which was converted in the early 1990 into the theatre. It was inaugurated in 1996 with a performance of the musical Grease.

Theatres in Düsseldorf